Darcy Antonellis Darcy Antonellis FSMPTE is an American businesswoman who has served as Chief Executive Officer of Vubiquity, Division President of Amdocs Media and President of Warner Bros Technical Operations.

Early life
The daughter of an engineer, Antonellis was born in Newark, New Jersey on April 16. She graduated from Temple University with a Bachelors in Electrical engineering in 1984, later undertaking a master's degree in Finance at Fordham University, which she completed in 1996.

Career
She was the Head of Operations at the CBS News department in Washington, D.C., then becoming Vice President, Technical Operations in New York and finally Vice President, Technical and Olympic Operations, organising the CBS coverage of the 1998 Olympics and the two prior Olympic Games, also serving as Director of Operations in Saudi Arabia and Kuwait during the First Gulf War.

In 1998 she moved to Warner Bros. as Senior Vice President, Distribution Technologies & Operations, receiving promotion to Executive Vice-President, Distribution Technologies & Operations in 2003. In 2004 she became Senior Vice-President for Worldwide Anti-Piracy Operations, and oversaw the creation of the world's first corporate anti-piracy operation, to be headquartered in Burbank, California but with a presence in London, Germany, South America and Asia. In 2008, Antonellis became President of Warner Bros Technical Operations reporting to Kevin Tsujihara and succeeding Chris Cookson. Her job was to oversee the supply chain, although she retained her previous anti-piracy jurisdiction. Antonellis joined Vubiquity as CEO in 2014.

Antonellis was Head of Technical and Olympic Operations for CBS Sports at three Winter Olympics; Albertville, Lillehammer and Nagano.

Memberships and Awards
In 2003 Antonellis was made a Fellow of the Society of Motion Picture and Television Engineers (SMPTE); her alma mater, Temple University, has also recognised her achievements in engineering. She has also received two Emmy Awards, won a Technology Leadership Award in 2007, and has served as a manager of the Hollywood division of the SMPTE. In October 2021 it was announced that Antonellis would be awarded a Lifetime Achievement Award From the Hollywood Professional Association.

Personal life
Antonellis is the mother of two children - Andrea and Sebastian.

She is passionate about sports and is a Philadelphia Eagles fan.

See also
 Warner Bros.
 Vubiquity

Notes

External links
 

1962 births
American Internet celebrities
Temple University College of Engineering alumni
Living people
Businesspeople from Newark, New Jersey
American women chief executives
American technology chief executives
Gabelli School of Business alumni
21st-century American women